WHBT may refer to:

WHBT (AM), a defunct radio station (1410 AM) formerly licensed to serve Tallahassee, Florida, United States
WHBT-FM, a radio station (92.1 FM) licensed to serve Moyock, North Carolina, United States